Earl's Palace can refer to:
Earl's Palace, Birsay
Earl's Palace, Kirkwall